The League of Ireland Cup, also referred to in Ireland as the 'League Cup', is an annual knockout competition in men's football in the Republic of Ireland. It is contested by League of Ireland clubs and invited clubs from the lower levels of the Republic of Ireland football league system. It has been sponsored by Electronic Arts and branded the EA Sports Cup since 2009.

The competition began in 1973–74, replacing the League of Ireland Shield and the Dublin City Cup. It has had several formats since its inception and has been a knock-out competition since 2005. As there is no European qualification for winners of the League of Ireland Cup, it has a lower status than the FAI Cup and is therefore seen as the third most important trophy in the Irish playing season.

The competition was not held in 2020 and 2021 as a result of delays and restrictions caused by the COVID-19 pandemic, and has yet to resume being held as of 2023.

List of League Cup Finals

Performance by club

 Includes results for Limerick and Limerick City.
 Includes results for Galway Rovers.
 Includes results for Waterford FC.

Sponsors

Bass League Cup: 1975–76 – 1978–79

Opel League Cup: 1986–87 – 1989–90

Bord Gáis League Cup: 1990–91 – 1995–96

Harp Lager League Cup: 1996–97 – 1998–99

Eircom League Cup: 1999–2000 – 2008

EA Sports Cup: 2009 –

Television coverage
The Final has been broadcast live since 2005, first by Setanta Sports, then since 2016 by its successor channel Eir Sport

See also
League of Ireland
League of Ireland Shield
FAI Cup

References

External links
Ireland League Cup Finals from RSSSF
League of Ireland Shield Winners from RSSSF

 
2
National association football league cups
Recurring sporting events established in 1973
1973 establishments in Ireland